John Rowland (1936–2002) was a Welsh professional footballer. Rowland joined Newport County in 1958 from local club Lovells Athletic. He went on to make 463 appearances for Newport scoring 9 goals. In 1969, he joined Merthyr Tydfil as player/manager.

References

External links

Welsh footballers
Wales under-23 international footballers
Newport County A.F.C. players
Merthyr Tydfil F.C. players
English Football League players
2002 deaths
Lovell's Athletic F.C. players
1936 births
Date of death missing
Association football defenders